May is the fifth month of the year in the Julian  and Gregorian calendars and is the third of seven months to have a length of 31 days.

May is a month of spring in the Northern Hemisphere, and autumn in the Southern Hemisphere. Therefore, May in the Southern Hemisphere is the seasonal equivalent of November in the Northern Hemisphere and vice versa. Late May typically marks the start of the summer vacation season in the United States (Memorial Day) and Canada (Victoria Day) that ends on Labor Day, the first Monday of September.

May (in Latin, Maius) was named for the Greek goddess Maia, who was identified with the Roman era goddess of fertility, Bona Dea, whose festival was held in May. Conversely, the Roman poet Ovid provides a second etymology, in which he says that the month of May is named for the maiores, Latin for "elders," and that the following month (June) is named for the iuniores, or "young people" (Fasti VI.88).

Eta Aquariids meteor shower appears in May. It is visible from about April 21 to about May 20 each year with peak activity on or around May 6. The Arietids shower from May 22 – July 2, and peaks on June 7. The Virginids also shower at various dates in May.

Ancient Roman observances 
Under the calendar of ancient Rome, the festival of Bona Dea fell on May 1, Argei fell on May 14 or May 15, Agonalia fell on May 21, and Ambarvalia on May 29. Floralia was held April 27 during the Republican era, or April 28 on the Julian calendar, and lasted until May 3. Lemuria (festival) fell on 9,11, and 13 May under the Julian calendar. The College of Aesculapius and Hygia celebrated two festivals of Rosalia (festival), one on May 11 and one on May 22. Rosalia was also celebrated at Pergamon on May 24–26. A military Rosalia festival, Rosaliae signorum, also occurred on May 31. Ludi Fabarici was celebrated on May 29 – June 1. Mercury would receive a sacrifice on the Ides of May (May 15).  Tubilustrium took place on May 23 as well as in March. These dates do not correspond to the modern Gregorian calendar.

May symbols 
 May's birthstone is the emerald which is emblematic of love and success.

 The May birth flowers are the Lily of the Valley and the Crataegus monogyna.  Both are native throughout the cool temperate Northern Hemisphere in Asia, Europe, and in the southern Appalachian Mountains in the United States, but have been naturalized throughout the temperate climatic world.
The "Mayflower" Epigaea repens is a North American harbinger of May, and the floral emblem of both Nova Scotia and Massachusetts. Its native range extends from Newfoundland south to Florida, west to Kentucky in the southern range, and to Northwest Territories in the north.
 The zodiac signs for the month of May are Taurus (until May 20) and Gemini (May 21 onwards).

May observances

Month-long observances 
 Working class history month
 Better Hearing and Speech Month
 In Catholic tradition, May is the Month of the Blessed Virgin Mary. See May devotions to the Blessed Virgin Mary
 Celiac Awareness Month
 Cystic Fibrosis Awareness Month.
 Ehlers-Danlos Syndrome Awareness month
 Flores de Mayo (Philippines)
 Garden for Wildlife month
 Huntington's Disease Awareness Month (International)
 International Mediterranean Diet Month
 Kaamatan harvest festival (Labuan, Sabah)
 New Zealand Music Month (New Zealand)
 National Pet Month (United Kingdom)
 National Smile Month (United Kingdom)
 Season of Emancipation (April 14 to August 23) (Barbados)
 Skin Cancer Awareness Month
 South Asian Heritage Month (International)
 World Trade Month

United States 
 Asian Pacific American Heritage Month
 National ALS Awareness Month
 Bicycle Month
 National Brain Tumor Awareness Month 
 National Burger Month 
 Community Action Awareness Month (North Dakota)
 National Electrical Safety Month
 National Foster Care Month
 National Golf Month 
 Jewish American Heritage Month
 Haitian Heritage Month
 Hepatitis Awareness Month
 Mental Health Awareness Month
 National Military Appreciation Month
 National Moving Month 
 National Osteoporosis Month 
 National Stroke Awareness Month
 National Water Safety Month 
 Older Americans Month

Non-Gregorian observances, 2020 
(All Baha'i, Islamic, and Jewish observances begin at the sundown prior to the date listed, and end at sundown of the date in question unless otherwise noted.)
 List of observances set by the Bahá'í calendar
 List of observances set by the Chinese calendar
 List of observances set by the Hebrew calendar
 List of observances set by the Islamic calendar
 List of observances set by the Solar Hijri calendar

Movable observances, 2020 
 Phi Ta Khon (Dan Sai, Loei province, Isan, Thailand) Dates are selected by village mediums and can take place anywhere between March and July.
 National Small Business Week (United States): May 5 – 11
 National Hurricane Preparedness Week (United States): May 5 – 11
 New Zealand Sign Language Week: May 6 – 12
 Green Office Week (Britain, United States): May 13 – 17
 Walk Safely to School Day (Australia): May 17
 Emergency Medical Services Week (United States): May 19 – 25
 Bike to Work Week Victoria (May 27 – June 2)

Movable Western Christian observances, 2020 dates 
 Special devotions to the Virgin Mary take place in May. See May devotions to the Blessed Virgin Mary.
Sunday after Divine Mercy Sunday: May 5 
 Jubilate Sunday
Monday and Tuesday in the week following the third Sunday of Easter: May 6–7 
 Hocktide (England)
Fourth Sunday after Easter: May 12 
 Cantate Sunday
 Good Shepherd Sunday
Fourth Friday after Easter: May 17 
 Store Bededag (Denmark)
Third Sunday of May: May 19 
 Feast of Our Lady of the Audience
Sunday preceding the Rogation days: May 26 
 Rogation Sunday 
Monday, Tuesday, and Wednesday preceding Feast of the Ascension: May 27–29
 Minor Rogation days
39 days after Easter: May 30 
 Feast of the Ascension
 Father's Day (Germany)
 Festa della Sensa  (Venice)
 Global Day of Prayer
 Sheep Festival (Cameroon)

Movable Eastern Christian observances, 2020 dates 
Wednesday after Pascha: May 1
 Bright Wednesday
Thursday after Pascha: May 2 
 Bright Thursday
Friday after Pascha: May 3 
 Bright Friday
Saturday after Pascha: May 4 
 Bright Saturday
8th day after Pascha: May 5 
 Thomas Sunday
2nd Tuesday of Pascha, or 2nd Monday of Pascha, depending on region: May 6 or May 7 
 Radonitsa (Russian Orthodox)
2nd Sunday following Pascha: May 12 
 Sunday of the Myrrhbearers
4th Sunday of Pascha: May 26 
 Sunday of the Paralytic
Wednesday after the Sunday of the Paralytic: May 29
 Mid-Pentecost

Non-religious and civic observances with movable dates

Last Friday in April to the first Sunday in May: April 26 – May 5 
 National Arbour Week (Ontario, Canada)

First Thursday: May 2 
 Arbour Day (Nova Scotia, Canada)
 National Day of Prayer (United States)
 National Day of Reason (United States)

First Saturday: May 4 
 Kentucky Derby (moved to September 5, 2020)
 Free Comic Book Day
 Green Up Day (Vermont, United States)
 World Naked Gardening Day

First Sunday: May 5 
 Mother's Day (Angola, Cape Verde, Hungary, Lithuania, Mozambique, Portugal, Spain)
 World Laughter Day

First full week: May 5–11 
 National Teacher Appreciation Week (United States)
 North American Occupational Safety and Health Week

Tuesday of First full week: May 4 
 National Teacher Appreciation Day (United States)

Wednesday of first full week: May 8 
 Occupational Safety and Health Professional Day

Second week in May: May 5–11 
 National Stuttering Awareness Week (United States)

First Tuesday: May 7 
 World Asthma Day

Friday preceding Second Sunday in May: May 10 
 Military Spouse Day (United States)
 National Public Gardens Day (United States)

Saturday closest to May 10: May 11 
 National Train Day (United States)

Second Saturday: May 8 
 International Migratory Bird Day (Canada, the United States, Mexico, Central and South America, and the Caribbean)
 National Tree Planting Day (Mongolia)

Second Weekend: May 11–12 
 National Mills Weekend (United Kingdom)
 World Migratory Bird Day

Second Sunday: May 9 
 National Nursing Home Week (United States)
 Children's Day (Spain)
 Father's Day (Romania)
 Mother's Day (Anguilla, Aruba, Australia, Austria, Bahamas, Barbados, Bangladesh, Belgium, Belize, Bermuda, Bonaire, Brazil, Brunei, Canada, Chile, Colombia, Cuba, Croatia, Curaçao, Czech Republic, Denmark, Ecuador, Estonia, Finland, Germany, Greece, Grenada, Honduras, Hong Kong, Iceland, India, Italy, Jamaica, Japan, Latvia, Malta, Malaysia, the Netherlands, New Zealand, Pakistan, Peru, Philippines, Puerto Rico, Singapore, Slovakia, South Africa, Suriname, Switzerland, Taiwan, Trinidad and Tobago, Turkey, United States, Uruguay, Venezuela, Zimbabwe)
 State Flag and State Emblem Day (Belarus)
 World Fair Trade Day

Week of May 12: May 6-12 
 National Nursing Week (United States)

Third Weekend, including Friday: May 14-16 
 Sanja Matsuri (Tokyo, Japan)

Third Friday: May 21 
 Arbour Day (Prince Edward Island, Canada)
 National Defense Transportation Day
 Endangered Species Day (United States)
 National Pizza Party Day (United States)

Third Saturday: May 15 
 The Preakness Stakes is run, second jewel in the triple crown of horse racing.
 Armed Forces Day (United States)
 Culture Freedom Day
 Sanja Matsuri
 World Whisky Day

Third Sunday: May 16 
 Commemoration Day of Fallen Soldiers
 Father's Day (Tonga)
 Feast of Our Lady of the Audience
 Sanja Matsuri (Tokyo, Japan)

Monday on or before May 24: May 24 
 Victoria Day (Scotland)

Third Monday: May 17 
 Discovery Day (Cayman Islands)

Monday on or before May 25: May 24 
 National Patriots' Day (Quebec)

Last Monday preceding May 25: May 24 
 Victoria Day (Canada)

May 24, or the nearest weekday if May 24 falls on a weekend: May 24 
 Bermuda Day (Bermuda)

Saturday closest to May 30: May 29 
 Armed Forces Day (Spain)

Last Weekend: May 29–30 
 Kyiv Day (Kyiv)

Last Sunday: May 30 
 Arbor Day (Venezuela)
 Children's Day (Hungary)
 Mother's Day (Algeria, Dominican Republic, Haiti, Mauritius, Morocco, Sweden, Tunisia)
 Turkmen Carpet Day (Turkmenistan)

Last Monday: May 31 
 Heroes' Day (Turks and Caicos Islands)
 Memorial Day (United States), a public holiday, is on May 30, but observed on the last Monday in May.
 Ratu Sir Lala Sukuna Day (Fiji), removed as a national holiday in 2010.

Last Wednesday: May 26 
 World Multiple Sclerosis Day

Last Thursday: May 27 
 Take a Girl Child to Work Day (South Africa)

Fixed observances in May 

 April 29 to May 5 in Japan, which includes four different holidays, is called "Golden Week". Many workers have up to 10 days off. There is also 'May sickness', where new students or workers start to be tired of their new routine. (In Japan the school year and fiscal year start on April 1.)
 Mayovka, in the context of the late Russian Empire, was a picnic in the countryside or in a park in the early days of May, hence the name. Eventually, "mayovka" (specifically, "proletarian mayovka") came to mean an illegal celebration of May 1 by revolutionary public, typically presented as an innocent picnic.
 May 1
 Armed Forces Day (Mauritania)
 Beltane (Ireland, Neopaganism)
 Constitution Day (Argentina)
 Lei Day (Hawaii, United States)
 May Day (International observance)
 May 2
 Anniversary of the Dos de Mayo Uprising (Community of Madrid, Spain)
 Birth Anniversary of Third Druk Gyalpo (Bhutan)
 Flag Day (Poland)
 Indonesia National Education Day
 May 3
 Constitution Day  (Poland)
 Constitution Memorial Day (Japan)
 Roodmas
 Sun Day (International)
 World Press Freedom Day
 May 4
 Anti-Bullying Day (United Nations)
 Bird Day (United States)
 Cassinga Day (Namibia)
 Death of Milan Rastislav Štefánik Day (Slovakia)
 Greenery Day (Japan)
 International Firefighters' Day
 May Fourth Movement commemorations:
 Literary Day (Taiwan)
 Youth Day (China)
 Remembrance Day for Martyrs and Disabled (Afghanistan)
 Remembrance of the Dead (Netherlands)
 Restoration of Independence day (Latvia)
 Star Wars Day (International observance)
 World Give Day
 Youth Day (Fiji)
 May 5
 Children's Day (Japan, Korea)
 Cinco de Mayo
 Constitution Day (Kyrgyzstan)
 Coronation Day (Thailand)
 Europe Day in Europe (uncommon usage, largely replaced by May 9).
 Feast of al-Khadr or Saint George (Palestinian people)
 Indian Arrival Day (Guyana)
 International Midwives' Day
 Liberation Day (Denmark)
 Liberation Day (Netherlands)
 Lusophone Culture Day (Community of Portuguese Language Countries)
 Martyrs' Day (Albania)
 Patriots' Victory Day (Ethiopia)
 Senior Citizens Day (Palau)
 Tango no sekku (Japan)
 May 6
 Martyrs' Day (Gabon)
 Martyrs' Day (Lebanon and Syria)
 International No Diet Day
 Teachers' Day (Jamaica)
 The first day of Hıdırellez (Turkey)
 St George's Day related observances (Eastern Orthodox Church):
 Day of Bravery, also known as Gergyovden (Bulgaria)
 Đurđevdan (Gorani, Roma)
 Police Day (Georgia)
 Yuri's Day (Russian Orthodox Church)
 May 7
 Defender of the Fatherland Day (Kazakhstan)
 Dien Bien Phu Victory Day (Vietnam)
 Radio Day (Russia, Bulgaria)
 May 8
 Miguel Hidalgo's birthday (Mexico)
 Parents' Day (South Korea)
 Time of Remembrance and Reconciliation for Those Who Lost Their Lives during the Second World War, continues to May 9
 Truman Day (Missouri, United States)
 White Lotus Day (Theosophy)
 World Red Cross and Red Crescent Day
 Veterans Day (Norway)
 VE Day in Western Europe. In Eastern Europe it is celebrated on May 9.
 May 9
 Anniversary of Dianetics (Church of Scientology)
 Europe Day (European Union)
 Liberation Day (Guernsey), commemorating the end of the German occupation of the Channel Islands during World War II.
 Liberation Day (Jersey), commemorating the end of the German occupation of the Channel Islands during World War II.
 Time of Remembrance and Reconciliation for Those Who Lost Their Lives during the Second World War, continued from May 8.
 Victory Day observances, celebration of the Soviet Union victory over Nazi Germany (Soviet Union, Azerbaijan, Belarus, Bosnia and Herzegovina, Georgia, Israel, Kazakhstan, Kyrgyzstan, Moldova, Russia, Serbia, Tajikistan, Turkmenistan, Uzbekistan)
 Victory Day over Nazism in World War II (Ukraine)
 Victory and Peace Day (Armenia) marks both the capture of Shusha (1992) in the First Nagorno-Karabakh War, and the end of World War II.
 May 10
 Children's Day (Maldives)
 Confederate Memorial Day (North Carolina and South Carolina)
 Constitution Day (Federated States of Micronesia)
 Golden Spike Day (1869 – Completion of the First transcontinental railroad – Promontory Summit, Utah)
 Independence Day (Romania), celebrating the declaration of independence of Romania from the Ottoman Empire in 1877.
 Liberation Day (Sark), commemorating the end of the German occupation of the Channel Islands during World War II.
 May 11
 National Technology Day (India)
 Statehood Day (Minnesota)
 Vietnam Human Rights Day (Vietnam)
 May 12
 Saint Andrea the First Day (Georgia (country))
 Day of the Finnish Identity (Finland)
 International Myalgic Encephalomyelitis/Chronic Fatigue Syndrome Awareness Day
 International Nurses Day
 May 13
 Abbotsbury Garland Day (Dorset, England)
 Heroes' Day (Romania)
 Rotuma Day (Rotuma, Fiji)
 May 14
 Hastings Banda's Birthday (Malawi)
 First day of Izumo-taisha Shrine Grand Festival. (Izumo-taisha, Japan)
 National Unification Day (Liberia)
 May 15
 Beginning of Tourette Syndrome awareness month. It ends on June 15
 Army Day (Slovenia)
 Constituent Assembly Day (Lithuania)
 Independence Day (Paraguay)
 International Day of Families
 Nakba Day (Palestinian communities)
 Peace Officers Memorial Day (United States)
 Republic Day (Lithuania)
 Saint Ubaldo Day
 Teachers' Day (Colombia, Mexico, South Korea)
 May 16
 Martyrs of Sudan (Episcopal Church (USA))
 St Brendan Birthday & Feast day
 Mass Graves Day (Iraq)
 National Day, declared by Salva Kiir Mayardit (South Sudan)
 Teachers' Day (Malaysia)
 May 17
 National Day Against Homophobia (Canada)
 International Day Against Homophobia, Transphobia and Biphobia, also known as IDAHOT
 Birthday of the Raja (Perlis)
 Children's Day (Norway)
 Constitution Day (Nauru)
 Galician Literature Day (Galicia (Spain))
 World Hypertension Day
 World Information Society Day
 Liberation Day (Democratic Republic of the Congo)
 Navy Day (Argentina)
 Norwegian Constitution Day
 May 18
 Baltic Fleet Day (Russia)
 Battle of Las Piedras Day (Uruguay)
 Day of Remembrance of Crimean Tatar genocide (Ukraine)
 Flag and Universities Day (Haiti)
 Independence Day (Somaliland) (unrecognized)
 International Museum Day
 Mullivaikkal Remembrance Day (Sri Lankan Tamils)
 Revival, Unity, and Poetry of Magtymguly Day (Turkmenistan)
 Teacher's Day (Syria)
 Victory Day (Sri Lanka)
 World AIDS Vaccine Day
 May 19
 Commemoration of Atatürk, Youth and Sports Day (Turkey, Northern Cyprus)
 Greek Genocide Remembrance Day (Greece)
 Hồ Chí Minh's Birthday (Vietnam)
 Malcolm X Day (United States of America)
 National Asian & Pacific Islander HIV/AIDS Awareness Day
 Hepatitis Testing Day (United States)
 May 20
 Day of Remembrance (Cambodia)
 Emancipation Day (Florida)
 European Maritime Day (European Council)
 Independence Day (Cuba)
 Independence Day, East Timor
 Josephine Baker Day (NAACP)
 National Awakening Day (Indonesia)
 National Day (Cameroon)
 World Metrology Day
 May 21
 Afro-Colombian Day (Colombia)
 Circassian Day of Mourning (Circassians)
 Day of Patriots and Military (Hungary)
 Navy Day (Chile)
 Saint Helena Day, celebrates the discovery of Saint Helena in 1502.
 World Day for Cultural Diversity for Dialogue and Development (International)
 One of the three festivals of Vejovis  (Roman Empire)
 May 22
 Abolition Day (Martinique)
 Harvey Milk Day (California)
 International Day for Biological Diversity (International)
 National Maritime Day (United States)
 National Sovereignty Day (Haiti)
 Republic Day (Sri Lanka)
 Translation of the Relics of Saint Nicholas from Myra to Bari (Ukraine)
 Unity Day (Yemen)
 World Goth Day
 May 23
 Constitution Day (Germany)
 Labour Day (Jamaica)
 Students' Day (Mexico)
 World Turtle Day
 May 24
 Feast of Mary Help of Christians (Roman Catholicism)
 Aldersgate Day/Wesley Day (Methodism)
 Battle of Pichincha Day (Ecuador)
 Commonwealth Day (Belize)
 Independence Day (Eritrea)
 Lubiri Memorial Day (Buganda)
 Saints Cyril and Methodius Day (Eastern Orthodox Church) and its related observance:
 Bulgarian Education and Culture and Slavonic Literature Day (Bulgaria)
 Saints Cyril and Methodius, Slavonic Enlighteners' Day (North Macedonia)
 May 25
 Africa Day (African Union)
 African Liberation Day (African Union)
 Day of Youth
 Geek Pride Day
 Independence Day (Jordan)
 Liberation Day (Lebanon)
 May Revolution (or Revolución de Mayo), a national holiday in Argentina
 International Missing Children's Day
 Last bell (Russia, post-Soviet countries)
 Liberation Day (Lebanon)
 National Day (Argentina)
 National Missing Children's Day (United States)
 National Tap Dance Day (United States)
 Towel Day
 May 26
 Crown Prince's Birthday (Denmark)
 Independence Day (Guyana)
 Independence Day (Georgia)
 Mother's Day (Poland)
 National Day of Healing (Australia)
 National Paper Airplane Day (United States)
 May 27
 Armed Forces Day (Nicaragua)
 Children's Day (Nigeria)
 Mother's Day (Bolivia)
 Navy Day (Japan)
 Slavery Abolition Day (Guadeloupe, Saint Barthélemy, Saint Martin)
 World MS Day
 Start of National Reconciliation Week (Australia)
 May 28
 Armed Forces Day (Croatia)
 Downfall of the Derg Day (Ethiopia)
 Flag Day (Philippines) (Display of the flag in all places until June 12 is encouraged)
 Independence Day (Armenia)
 Republic Day (Nepal)
 TDFR Republic Day
 Youm-e-Takbir (Pakistan)
 May 29
 Army Day (Argentina)
 International Day of United Nations Peacekeepers (International)
 Oak Apple Day (England), and its related observance:
 Castleton Garland Day (Castleton)
 Statehood Day (Rhode Island and Wisconsin)
 Veterans Day (Sweden)
 World Digestive Health Day
 May 30
 Anguilla Day (Anguilla)
 Canary Islands Day (Spain)
 Indian Arrival Day (Trinidad and Tobago)
 Lod Massacre Remembrance Day (Puerto Rico)
 Mother's Day (Nicaragua)
 Parliament Day (Croatia)
 May 31
 Anniversary of Royal Brunei Malay Regiment (Brunei)
 Castile–La Mancha Day (Castile-La Mancha)
 Visitation of Mary (Western Christianity)
 World No Tobacco Day (International)

See also 
 List of historical anniversaries

References 

 
05